The 2007 Rally New Zealand (37th Propecia Rally New Zealand), 11th round of 2007 World Rally Championship, was run on 31 August to 2 September. After a tight battle for three days, Marcus Grönholm beat Sébastien Loeb for the win by 0.3 seconds, making it the second-closest finish in WRC history (after 2011 Jordan Rally's 0.2s). This was the closest finish in the history of the World Rally Championship. The previous record was held by the 1998 Rally de Portugal, in which Colin McRae took the win 2.1 seconds ahead of Carlos Sainz.



Results

Special Stages 
All dates and times are NZST (UTC+12).

Championship standings after the event

Drivers' championship

Manufacturers' championship

References

External links 
 Results on the official site: WRC.com
 Results on eWRC-results.com
 Results at Jonkka's World Rally Archive

New Zealand
2007
Rally